Négra Lock is a single chamber lock on the Canal du Midi near the village of Villefranche-de-Lauragais in  Languedoc, France. There is a small chapel at the lock and also a small red-brick aqueduct which carries the canal over the Thésauque, a tributary of the Hers.

Négra Lock is at an altitude of 166m and is ascending when travelling west–east. The adjacent locks are Laval Lock to the east and Sanglier Lock to the west.

See also
Locks on the Canal du Midi

Locks on the Canal du Midi